The Party for Freedom (PVV) is a nationalist, right-wing populist political party in the Netherlands.

Founded in 2006 as the successor to Geert Wilders' one-man faction in the House of Representatives, it won nine seats in the 2006 general election making it the fifth-largest party in parliament. In the 2010 general election it won 24 seats, making it the third-largest party. At that time the PVV agreed to support the minority government led by Prime Minister Mark Rutte without having PVV ministers in the cabinet. However, the PVV withdrew its support in April 2012 due to differences over budget cuts at the Catshuis. In the following 2012 Dutch general election it won 15 seats, having lost 9 seats in the elections, still being the third-largest party. Following the elections, the party returned to the opposition and in the 2017 election, the Party for Freedom won 20 seats, making it the second-largest party in Parliament. It came third in the 2014 European Parliament election, winning four out of 26 seats.

The PVV calls for items like administrative detention and a strong assimilationist stance on the integration of immigrants into Dutch society, differing from the established centre-right parties in the Netherlands (like the People's Party for Freedom and Democracy, VVD). The PVV has also proposed banning the Quran and shutting down all mosques in the Netherlands. In addition, the party is consistently Eurosceptic and since early July 2012, according to the platform it presented prior to elections in September, it strongly advocates withdrawal from the European Union.

Party for Freedom is an association with Geert Wilders as its sole member; thus the party is ineligible for Dutch government funding, and relies on donations.

History

2004–2005 
The party's history began with Geert Wilders' departure from the VVD in September 2004. Wilders could not accept the VVD's positive stance towards Turkey's possible accession to the European Union, and left the party.

Although the VVD expected Wilders to return his parliamentary seat to the party, he refused, and continued to sit in parliament as a one-man party, Groep Wilders (Wilders Group).

In June 2005, Wilders was one of the leaders in the campaign against the European Constitution, which was rejected by Dutch voters by 62%.

2006–2010 

On 22 February 2006, the Party for Freedom was registered with the Electoral Council.

Bart Jan Spruyt, director of the conservative Edmund Burke Foundation, joined Wilders in January 2006 in order to formulate a party programme and to train its prospective representatives for the forthcoming national election (then still scheduled for 2007).
Spruyt left the party in the summer of 2006 after it proved unable to build broad conservative backing, and people like Joost Eerdmans and Marco Pastors proved unwilling to join. After the 2006 elections, Spruyt said he was not surprised that the Party for Freedom had gained seats but maintained that, if the Party for Freedom had sought cooperation with Eerdmans and Pastors, it would have won more, even enough to bring about a CDA-VVD majority government.
Later, Spruyt commented that the PVV had a 'natural tendency' toward fascism. He later qualified the statement, though he didn't withdraw it. Former PVV candidate Lucas Hartong called Spruyt's claims 'a cheap insinuation'.

In an HP/De Tijd profile dated December 2006, the party was described as a cult, with an extremely distrustful Wilders only accepting fellow candidates completely loyal to him, and compared the PVV to the Socialist Party led by Jan Marijnissen but without reaching that degree of organisational perfection.

On 10 January 2007, the PVV announced it would not field candidates at the forthcoming Provincial elections. This meant it would be unrepresented in the Senate.

On 13 January 2007, NRC Handelsblad reported that a PVV intern had solicited for signatures on the website forums Dutch Disease Report and Polinco, the latter a forum described as far-right by various organisations, among them the Dutch Complaints Bureau for Discrimination on the Internet. Any party participating in this election was required to collect at least 30 signatures from supporters in each of the 19 electoral districts; of the 1500 signatures the PVV received, the Dutch Antifascist group identified 34 known far-right supporters. In a response, Wilders said he regretted that far-right sympathisers had provided signatures, denied any personal responsibility for them and reasserted his dislike of far-right parties like National Front of France and Flemish Interest.
Noted writer and columnist Leon de Winter later declared the affair to be the result of a campaign of demonisation against Geert Wilders led by NRC Handelsblad and de Volkskrant newspapers, as well as the broadcaster VARA.

Former trade union leader and prominent Christian Democrat Doekle Terpstra proposed an initiative against Geert Wilders and the PVV on 30 November 2007, in the newspaper Trouw. Terpstra sees Wilders as promoting intolerance, and discrimination against Muslims. He is supported in his cause by the large Dutch trade unions and refugee organisations. Politicians and the public are divided on Terpstra's initiative. The newspaper De Pers reported the next day that much of Terpstra's claimed support did not materialise.

In 2008, the Friends of the Party of Freedom commissioned a producer, who acted under the name of "Scarlet Pimpernel Productions", a pseudonym adopted out of fear of reprisal, to produce Fitna, a short film by Geert Wilders. Approximately 17 minutes in length, it shows selected excerpts from Suras of the Qur'an, interspersed with media clips and newspaper cuttings showing or describing acts of violence or hatred by Muslims. The film attempts to demonstrate that the Qur'an motivates its followers to hate all who violate Islamic teachings. Consequently, the film argues that Islam encourages acts of terrorism, antisemitism, violence against women and homosexuals, and Islamic universalism. A large part of the film deals with the influence of Islam on the Netherlands. The film's title, the Arabic word "fitna", means  either "disagreement and division among people" or a "test of faith in times of trial". Wilders described the film as "a call to shake off the creeping tyranny of Islamisation".

Polling by Maurice de Hond published in March 2009 indicated that the PVV was the most popular parliamentary party. The polls predicted that the party would take 21 per cent of the national vote, giving it 32 out of 150 seats in the Dutch parliament. If the polling results were to be replicated at a genuine election, Wilders would be a major power broker and could become Prime Minister. However, De Hond's results were not uncontroversial, as they were based on a panel of people who have signed up for the election poll on the Internet and thus were not a random sample. According to Joop van Holsteyn, professor of election research, therefore, De Hond's polls were not representative of the population. Other Dutch polls (Politieke Barometer and TNS NIPO) have shown contrasting results, with the PVV often getting less support, though still remaining very popular.

On 15 May 2009, the PVV asked Balkenende to support the foundation of a Greater Netherlands actively.

By February 2010, the PVV had once more become the most popular party, according to a poll by Maurice de Hond which said it would win 27–32 parliameary seats in the next election, up two from the previous poll in early January.

On 3 March 2010, elections for the local councils were held in the municipalities of the Netherlands. The PVV only contested these in The Hague and Almere, because of a shortage of good candidates. MP Raymond de Roon headed the campaign in his home town of Almere. Fellow MP Sietse Fritsma was appointed head of the local election campaign in The Hague. Both men would continue to serve as MPs as well as local councillors after their election. The PVV made big gains, suggesting that the party and Wilders might dominate the political scene in the run-up to the parliamentary elections scheduled on 9 June 2010. The PVV won in Almere and came second to the Labour Party in The Hague. In Almere, the PVV won 21 percent of the vote to Labour's 18 percent, preliminary results showed. In The Hague, the PVV had 8 seats – second to Labour with 10 seats. The local elections were the first test of public opinion since the collapse of the 4th Balkenende cabinet in February 2010. The municipal elections were overshadowed by the fall of the cabinet and the forthcoming parliamentary elections.

On 8 March 2010, Wilders announced he would take a seat on The Hague city council, after it became clear that he had won 13,000 preference votes. Earlier he had said he would not do so. One week after these local elections, the PVV called for an inquiry into the elections in The Hague, since a YouTube clip allegedly showed irregularities, including more than one person entering polling booths at the same time and a voter not putting the ballot paper into the box. These calls were rejected. The Hague council said the municipal elections had gone well and that any complaint should anyway have been lodged immediately after the results were announced. In Rotterdam, a full recount was held after a protest by Leefbaar Rotterdam, a local party with a programme broadly similar to that of the PVV.

On 18 March 2010, the PVV gave up trying to form a governing coalition in Almere. In a press release, the party said most of the other parties had refused to give ground to PVV demands on what it describes as "essential issues". These include what the party calls ‘city commandos’: street patrols to keep order in the face of inadequate proper law enforcement. Other obstacles were the PVV's demands for reduced taxes for Almere residents and its fight against what the party sees as "the increasing influence of Islam in Dutch society". The PVV complained that it was forced to stay in the opposition through the manoeuvring of the political elite.

2010–2012 

In the parliamentary elections of 9 June 2010, the PVV went from 9 to 24 seats (of 150), winning over 15% of the votes, making the PVV the third largest party in parliament.

By July 2010, the PVV again became the biggest party in the polls after the parliamentary elections, following difficulties in forming a new coalition and the PVV technically being excluded from the coalition talks because the CDA showed reluctance to cooperate with the PVV. According to the polls, the PVV would get 35 seats in a new election, which is a record high number.

In August 2010, during the difficult cabinet formation following the elections, the PVV emerged as a prominent player in a proposal for a new minority government in the Netherlands. While the party would not gain a ministerial appointment, the PVV would tolerate a centre-right minority government coalition: a proposed deal that would make the party one of the most influential forces. Led by Ivo Opstelten, a former mayor of Rotterdam who was appointed mediator for the next stage of negotiations, the forming of a government of VVD and Christian Democratic Appeal (CDA) with support of the PVV was negotiated; the resulting coalition agreement "included elements it pushed for, such as a burqa ban," though the ban was never put in place.  The VVD and CDA would have to rely on the PVV to get important legislation through. With this deal the Netherlands would follow the "Danish model", since in Denmark the anti-immigration Danish People's Party also stayed out of government but supported a minority center-right Liberal-Conservative government. The very fact of the participation of the PVV in these coalition negotiations has caused fierce discussions in political circles and was considered very unlikely until recently.

After the elections, CDA parliamentary fraction president Maxime Verhagen first had stated that as a matter of principle he refused to negotiate with VVD and PVV about a centre-right government, saying that the PVV represented views that could not be reconciled with Dutch law. These objections on principle disappeared in five weeks and Verhagen turned out to be willing to negotiate over a cabinet whose fate would (also) lie in the hands of Wilders.

On 20 March 2012, Hero Brinkman quit the party, citing a lack of democratic structure within the PVV among other things; qualifying this with a statement of continued support for the minority Rutte cabinet. Two days later, three members of the States of North Holland representing the PVV followed his example. In July 2012, Marcial Hernandez and Wim Kortenoeven quit the PVV, both citing what they considered to be Wilders' autocratic leadership of the party.

2012–2017 

In the parliamentary elections of 12 September 2012, the PVV went from 24 to 15 seats (of 150), winning 10% of the vote.

In October 2013, the party expelled Louis Bontes, but he kept his seat in parliament. In March 2014, Roland van Vliet and Joram van Klaveren left the party and also kept their seats in parliament.

In the European Parliament election on 22 May 2014, the party kept its four seats in the European Parliament. MEP Hans Jansen died on 5 May 2015 and was replaced by Auke Zijlstra on 1 September 2015.

On 16 June 2015, the Party for Freedom and other right-wing nationalist parties in the European Parliament formed the political group Europe of Nations and Freedom. Marcel de Graaff of the PVV and Marine Le Pen of the National Front became the first co-presidents of this group.

2017–present 

For the 2017 Dutch general election, the Party for Freedom had an election platform of a single page. Before the election, all major parties said they would not form a government coalition with the PVV. A typical House of Representatives has a large number of parties represented, since it takes as little as 0.67 percent of the vote to get a seat.  With such a fragmented vote, the PVV would have needed the support of other parties in order to make Wilders prime minister, even if it won the most seats in the House of Representatives. Wilders hinted that a "revolution" would occur if the PVV won the most seats and was still locked out of power.

The party won 20 seats (of 150) according to the preliminary results, which is five seats more than in the previous election in 2012, making it the second-largest party in Parliament.

The party performed poorly in the 2019 Dutch provincial elections and reported issues attracting suitable candidates, losing 26 seats, with the Forum for Democracy taking many of its voters. The party saw its best performance in Limburg in which it won seven representatives. The party also saw a setback during the 2019 European Parliament election in which it did not return any MEPs, but was allocated one in post-Brexit appointments which was taken by Marcel de Graaff until 2022 when he defect to FvD. The party finished in third place during the 2021 Dutch general election.

Ideology

The Party for Freedom combines conservative, liberal, right and left standpoints in a populistic programme. On certain themes like healthcare, social services and elderly care the PVV can be seen as left and social, though selective. Regarding immigration and culture the party is nationalistic. It believes that the Judeo-Christian and humanist traditions should be taken as the dominant culture in the Netherlands, and that immigrants should adapt accordingly. The party wants a halt to immigration especially from non-Western countries. It is hostile towards the EU, is against future EU enlargement to Muslim-majority countries like Turkey and opposes a dominant presence of Islam in the Netherlands. The party campaigns on a strong counter-jihad agenda. More specifically, the party has called for a banning the Quran, and shutting down all mosques in the Netherlands. The party is also opposed to dual citizenship (see below). The Party for Freedom's political platform has sometimes overlapped with that of the assassinated Rotterdam politician Pim Fortuyn and his Pim Fortuyn List. Wilders has been described as positioning himself to inherit Fortuyn's former supporters.

The Parliamentary Documentation Center (Parlementair Documentatie Centrum) of the Leiden University characterises the PVV as "populist, with both conservative, liberal, right-wing and left-wing positions".

In December 2008, the eighth study "Monitor Racism and Extremism", conducted by the Anne Frank Foundation and the Leiden University, has found that the Party for Freedom can be considered far-right, although "with ifs and buts". Economically, they are viewed as a left-wing party, while others have described the party as economically liberal. Peter Rodrigues and Jaap van Donselaar, who have academically guided the study, explain this classification with the Islamophobia, nationalism, and "sharp aversion to the strange", subsumed as racism, which they have observed within the party.

In January 2010, the report Polarisatie en radicalisering in Nederland (transl. "Polarisation and radicalisation in the Netherlands") by political researchers Moors, Lenke Balogh, Van Donselaar and De Graaff from the Tilburg University research group IVA stated that the PVV was not an extreme right-wing party, but contained some radical right-wing elements. The study claims that the PVV holds xenophobic ideas, but not antisemitic ideas – the PVV describes its culture as Jewish-Christian humanistic. "The PVV statements on Islamisation and non-Western immigrants appear to be discriminatory and the party organisation is authoritarian rather than democratic", said the researchers, who were looking into polarisation and radicalism across the Netherlands. They described the PVV as the "new radical right", a party with a national democratic ideology but without extreme right-wing roots. In particular, the report stated that the party's pro-Israel stance showed that it was not neo-Nazi. It tends however towards a national democratic ideology. Wilders called the report "scandalous"—in particular the link between defending the national interest and the radical right.

An alleged earlier version of the report, leaked to the Dutch daily newspaper de Volkskrant in November 2009, said that Wilders' party is an extreme right-wing grouping and a threat to social cohesion and democracy. The paper claimed at the time the researchers were under pressure to water down the conclusions because of their political sensitivity. The Dutch Minister of the Interior and Kingdom Relations Guusje ter Horst, (2007–2010), Labour (PvdA), who commissioned the research, denied exerting any interference. In response, Wilders accused her of "playing a dirty game".

Some commentators and international scholarly publications have argued that the party is far-right; for example, the ex-prime minister Van Agt regards the party as ultra-right-wing, and Bert de Vries (CDA) draws comparisons with the small Centre Party. The political scientist Lucardie, on the other hand, considers it necessary to reserve the 'far-right' qualification for national socialists and fascists, though PVV is itself widely accused of fascism. International media outlets, similarly, have followed this classification. The party has been regarded by some as anti-Polish, anti-Slavic, anti-Romani and anti-Muslim. Wilders however maintains that he is not anti-Muslim, only anti-Islam, summing up his views by stating "I don't hate Muslims, I hate Islam".

International affairs commentator Marlene Spoerri has opined that while PVV endorses anti-Islam and eurosceptic positions, it also differs from other European populist and nationalist parties such as the Flemish Vlaams Belang or the French National Front, arguing that the PVV has not historically espoused antisemitic rhetoric and does not advocate for a return to "traditional family values," but instead takes a firmly pro-Israel stance and has supported socially liberal positions such women's and gay rights, abortion and euthanasia in its platform.

Positions

Dual nationality
In February 2007, PVV parliamentarian Fritsma introduced a motion that would have prohibited any parliamentarian or executive branch politician from having dual citizenship. The PVV claimed that dual nationals have unclear loyalty. The motion would have made it difficult, if not impossible for Labour MPs Ahmed Aboutaleb and Nebahat Albayrak to become members of the fourth Balkenende cabinet. The motion had to be withdrawn, however, after objection from the Speaker of the House of Representatives, Gerdi Verbeet (Labour Party). Maastricht University law professor  has commented on the risk in executive branch officials having dual citizenship. however the European Convention on Human Rights as reviewed in 2010 ECtHR jurisprudence has reaffirmed that form of discrimination is a violation of a human right. However, in 2007 the PVV planned to call for a vote of no confidence against junior ministers Aboutaleb and Albayrak when the new cabinet had its first meeting with the House of Representatives, claiming that their respectively Moroccan and Turkish passports put their loyalties into question. In the event, the motion was only supported by the PVV itself.

The issue of dual nationality, however, was not over yet. On 2 March 2007, Radio Netherlands Worldwide reported that Labour Party MP Khadija Arib, who had been sworn into parliament the day before, was sitting on a commission appointed by the king of Morocco. The PVV said that this commission work endangers Arib's loyalty to the Netherlands, and that she should choose between being a member of the Dutch parliament or the Moroccan commission. Geert Wilders said that Arib's remark on national television that her loyalty lay neither with the Netherlands nor Morocco was shameful. The liberal VVD party similarly remarked that her "double orientation would hurt Dutch integration." All other parties were appalled by the PVV and VVD's comments.

Perhaps in the light of the Moldova ruling, in the first Rutte government in 2010 chaired by the VVD leader, supported by the PVV, Marlies Veldhuijzen van Zanten became the new State Secretary for Health, Welfare and Sport, having both Dutch and Swedish nationality.

Immigration
The party fielded a controversial motion in the 2007 general deliberations on the immigration budget, calling for a stop to immigration from Muslim countries. The House of Representatives at first declined to bring the motion forward for debate. Justice Minister Ernst Hirsch Ballin said it was in violation of the Dutch constitution and international law. Another motion by the PVV, against police officers wearing veils, did gain a parliamentary majority.

In 2012, the PVV party launched a website named Reporting Centre on Central and East Europeans to receive complaints about Central and East European immigrants in the Netherlands. 'Do you have problems with people from Central and Eastern Europe? Have you lost your job to a Pole, a Bulgarian, a Romanian or another East European? We want to know,' the website states. It displays newspaper headlines such as 'Wouldn't it be better if you went back home?' and 'East Europeans, increasingly criminal'. The European Commission has condemned the website, and EU Justice Commissioner Viviane Reding declared, "We call on all citizens of the Netherlands not to join in this intolerance. Citizens should instead clearly state on the PVV's website that Europe is a place of freedom." The website caused a lot of controversy within the European Union.

Financing political parties
The PVV has declared that, since it is against state subsidies, it rejects the idea of itself being financially supported by the government and believes the "taxpayers should not pay for political parties they don't support".

In 2012, the Dutch Parliament discussed tightening the financial rules for political parties, forcing them to become more transparent. The PVV indicated that it would use any means available to avoid disclosing the identity of its donors.

Israeli-Arab conflict 
The PVV supports the one-state solution and considers Jordan to be 'the only Palestinian state that will ever exist'. In 2010, Geert Wilders voiced his support for Yisrael Beiteinu and held talks with its leader Avigdor Lieberman. Geert Wilders is a frequent visitor to Israel and spent six months on a moshav in the West Bank at the age of 17. The party supports recognising Jerusalem as the capital of Israel and proposed moving the Dutch embassy there.

Party platform

Other policies that Wilders mentions in his party programme for the 2010 general election:
 Harsh punishment of violence against Jews and the LGBT community, which it claims is disproportionately committed by Muslims (p. 13)
 Recording the ethnicity of all Dutch citizens. (p. 11)
 Prohibition of halal and kosher slaughter (p. 55) (However, Wilders has stated that opposition to kosher slaughter was not part of his party's agenda and that support for the ban had been withdrawn)
 Limitation of cannabis coffee shops within a radius of no less than 1 kilometer from schools (p. 11)
 Active repatriation of criminals of foreign citizenship and Dutch nationals originating from the Netherlands Antilles (p. 11)
 Deportation of criminals having foreign nationality or multiple citizenship back to their country of origin, after a prison sentence (p. 13)
 Restrictions on immigrant labour from new EU member states and Islamic countries (p. 15)
 Removal of resources from anti-climate change programs, development aid, and immigration services (p. 17)
 Abolition of the Dutch Senate (p. 19)
 Shutting down of all Islamic schools and mosques (p. 15)
 Ban on Islamic gender apartheid (p. 15)
 The General Pension (AOW) age not to be increased beyond 65 (p. 21)
 Governmental communication to be exclusively in Dutch or Frisian (p. 35)
 Dutch language proficiency and a 10-year Dutch residency and work experience requirement for welfare assistance (p. 15)
 Constitutional protection of the dominance of the Judeo-Christian and humanistic culture of the Netherlands (p. 35)
 Choosing to defend the essential elements of Dutch culture: freedom of the LGBT community, as well as assured equality of men and women which Islam strongly challenges (p. 33)
 Respect for May 4 as a day to remember victims of National Socialism. (p. 35)
 Repeal of no-smoking legislation in bars (p. 39)
 Referring to Jordan as 'Palestine' (p. 43)
 One-state solution to the Israel-Palestine conflict (p. 43)
 Investment in more nuclear power plants and clean coal plants to reduce dependency on imported oil and because coal is cheaper (p. 47)
 Withdrawal from the European Union.
 Return to the guilder (old Dutch currency) and abandonment of the euro.
 Abolition of the European Parliament and no cooperation in any EU activity.
 Ask the EU to remove the "Dutch" star in the European flag.
 Repeal flight tax or carbon dioxide tax.
 Binding referendum on subjects like the EU and a multicultural society.
 No more tax money to (political) left organisations.
 Keeping track of the ethnicity of people who have committed crimes.
 Select policemen on "decisiveness".
 Binding assimilation contracts for immigrants.
 Taxes on the Islamic headscarf and prohibition of the Koran. 
 Ban on headscarves in any public function.
 Support Afrikaners, as it is Dutch heritage.
 Opposition to Turkey's membership in NATO; support for remaining in NATO.
 Halt all support and propaganda for Palestine and Palestinians and recognize West Jerusalem as Israeli Capital.
 No more windmills and funding for durability or  reduction; no more "fiscal greening".

Name and symbols 
The name 'Party for Freedom' (Partij voor de Vrijheid) is a reference to the Freedom Party (Partij van de Vrijheid), a Dutch political party founded in 1946, shortly after World War II. In 1948, the Freedom Party went on as the People's Party for Freedom and Democracy (Volkspartij voor Vrijheid en Democratie), which is the party Wilders split from.

The party logo consists of the party name and a gull in red, white, and blue, which are the colors of the Dutch flag. The gull symbolises freedom or liberty. The gull had also been used as a symbol by the National Socialist Movement in the Netherlands on propaganda posters and for their youth wing, but Wilders claimed it was not inspired by Nazi usage.

Organisation and support 
In order to register for elections in the Netherlands, a political party needs to be an association, which can be founded by two or more members. The Vereniging Groep Wilders (Association Group Wilders) was founded by the natural person Geert Wilders and Stichting Groep Wilders (Foundation Group Wilders), of which Wilders is the only board member. The association was later renamed to Partij voor de Vrijheid (Party for Freedom). After the creation of the association, Wilders disabled new member registration, resulting in his remaining the sole member of the party. The party is considered unique in Dutch politics in that it does not organise public party conferences and does not have local departments, a youth wing, or a research institute. Instead, PVV supporters have the option of financially donating to the party or signing up as unaffiliated volunteers during elections. Candidates are mostly handpicked by Wilders who also writes the PVV's platform. Former PVV politician Hero Brinkman unsuccessfully tried to lobby for the party to adopt a conventional membership system and a youth wing. However, Wilders has defended the party's structure, stating that he does not want extremists to take over the PVV, while others have cited the example of the defunct Pim Fortuyn List party which shared many similar policies to the PVV but succumbed to factional infighting following the murder of its founder. Commentators have also cited Wilders as one of the first party leaders to use web and social media messages to reach voters instead of traditional public campaigning such as public rallies or meet and greets.

Due to the PVV's structure, foreign political journalists have noted that members of the public do not often out themselves as PVV supporters and that it is sometimes difficult to determine who votes for the party despite its generally substantial results in elections. Some media outlets have noted that in line with other European populist parties, its voters tend to either be on the lower end of the socio-economic spectrum or those concerned about immigration and crime. A 2017 study by Dutch polling company Etnobarometer found that the PVV also receives support from some ethnic minority communities and that it was the second most voted for party among Surinamese-Dutch voters after the Labour Party, with the PVV doing particularly well among voters of Indo-Surinamese and Indian heritage.

Financing
In the Netherlands, a political party needs to have 1,000 members or more to be eligible for government funding, a requirement which the Party for Freedom does not meet with Wilders being the only member.

On several instances the PVV applied for and received European Union funding.

Financially, the party has been largely relying on donations. The party has not disclosed any of its finances until 2013. According to Hero Brinkman, a former MP for the party, the PVV received most of its finances from certain foreign (American) lobby-groups. According to Reuters, Daniel Pipes' Middle East Forum paid for the trials and security of Geert Wilders and David Horowitz paid Wilders "a good fee" for two speeches given in the US.

Since 2013, Dutch political parties are required by law to disclose all donations of 4,500 euro or more. The Party for Freedom disclosed no donations for 2013. For 2014 to 2016, the party disclosed a total of 148,391.07 euro in donations from the California-based David Horowitz Freedom Center, a total of 18,700 euro in donations from a private donor in the Netherlands, and a donation of 6,853.70 euro from the New York-based company FOL Inc. The 2015 donations of just over 108,244 euro from the Freedom Center was "the largest individual contribution to a Dutch political party that year."

Election results

House of Representatives

Senate

European Parliament

Representation

Members of the House of Representatives
The seventeen members of the House of Representatives for the Party for Freedom are:

 Geert Wilders, parliamentary leader
 Roy van Aalst
 Fleur Agema
 Harm Beertema
 Martin Bosma
 Teun van Dijck
 Sietse Fritsma
 Machiel de Graaf
 Dion Graus
 Lilian Helder
 Léon de Jong
 Alexander Kops
 Barry Madlener
 Vicky Maeijer
 Gidi Markuszower
 Edgar Mulder
 Raymond de Roon
 Danai van Weerdenburg

Members of the Senate
The five members of the Senate for the Party for Freedom are:
 Marjolein Faber, parliamentary leader
 Ilse Bezaan
 Alexander van Hattem
 Ton van Kesteren
 Gom van Strien

Members of the European Parliament

The PVV lost all it seats in the 2019 European Parliament election. However, the party received an MEP appointed in the wake of the re-allocation of UK seats after Brexit, namely Marcel de Graaff, who became an MEP in February 2020 but who defected to Forum for Democracy in January 2022.

See also

 Cultural conservatism
 Criticism of Islam
 Criticism of Islamism
 Criticism of multiculturalism

References

Further reading

External links

 (in Dutch)

 
2006 establishments in the Netherlands
Geert Wilders
Anti-Islam political parties in Europe
Climate change denial
Counter-jihad
Political parties established in 2006
Political parties in the Netherlands
Anti-Islam sentiment in the Netherlands
Right-wing populist parties
Member parties of the Identity and Democracy Party
Right-wing parties in Europe
Organisations based in The Hague
Anti-immigration politics in Europe
Eurosceptic parties in the Netherlands
Far-right political parties
Far-right politics in the Netherlands
National liberal parties
Nationalist parties in the Netherlands
Right-wing populism in the Netherlands
Islamophobia in the Netherlands